Anthony Arnett is an American martial artist specializing in Chinese martial arts, particularly Wing Chun. He is a direct disciple of Australian Wing Chun pioneer William Cheung and is founder of his own system, Arnett Sport Kung Fu.

Arnett is a martial artist and has been inducted into Universal Martial Arts Hall of Fame.

Background

Early life
Though Arnett had learnt martial arts from his uncle, he was reluctant to display his skills, as he felt that Asian martial arts were seen "kicking and flailing" and considered to be effeminate behavior that could attract ridicule and other kind of unwanted attention from the local youth gangs.

Arnett kept his martial arts skills hidden until 1975, when he saw the movie Five Fingers of Death. With the kung fu craze of the period, Arnett realized the popularity of Chinese martial arts and stopped hiding his martial arts knowledge.

Arnett began competing in Point Tournaments in 1974 then in 1977 he became a division champion in local tournaments.

In 1980s and 1990s
He opened his first Wing Chun School in Maryland, co-opened a second school in 1983 then in 1986 he opened the first Traditional Wing Chun School in Georgia and opened the second Wing Chun School in Augusta, Georgia, in 1987 before finally settling to teach in Jacksonville, Florida.

In 1984 he became an East Coast Grand Champion then became Grand Champion in Fighting and Forms while competing in Georgia in 1989.

In 1993 he was Grand Champion in Continuous Sparring for the 3rd year in a row. Arnett retained the Division Championship title for 6 years in a row and retained the Division Championship title in the Tri State Circuit.

In 1996 he completed a three volume video series on Arnett Sport Kung Fu starring Grandmaster William Cheung and himself.  In 1998 he opened his first private lessons studio exclusively for one on one sessions in Jacksonville, Florida. Arnett started promoting tournament training camps and seminars in 1999.

2000 to present
In 2000 Arnett won numerous championships including the Overall Championship in the National Arts League for Forms Demonstration, Weapons Demonstration and Most Student Competitors. Arnett was awarded NKKU Ultimate Grand Champion for 2001 in Forms, Weapons, and Fighting in the Masters Division and also Grand Champion in the North Florida Martial Arts Association.

In 2002 Arnett opened a 3rd school in Orange Park, Florida and would being distributing of training guides for Traditional Wing Chun Kung Fu and Arnett Sport Kung Fu in DVD and CD-ROM formats.

In 2005 Arnett became the official martial arts instructor for NFL Football Team Jacksonville Jaguars, their strength and conditioning coach Mark Asanovich praised and thanked Arnett for his work with the team he wrote in a letter; the training was much liked by the players, well designed and well run and that he would continue to support Arnett Sport Kung Fu in future relationships.

In 2012 Arnett was personally invited by William Cheung to be guest instructor at the Cheung's Wing Chun Kung Fu Academy in Melbourne, Australia Headquarters of the Global Traditional Wing Chun Kung Fu Association.

Accomplishments

Awards and honors
 Arnett appeared on Inside Kung Fu Magazine May 2006 front cover with Jackie Chan Featured in the Magazine article "Cheung Style for Tournaments".
 2004 Universal Hall of Fame inductee for Kung-Fu Artist of the Year.

Grand Champion highlights

Instructor lineage

Images

References

External links
 Official Website Jacksonville

Living people
American male karateka
American Wing Chun practitioners
Year of birth missing (living people)
American male martial artists